Frédéric-Charles Victor de Vernon (17 November 1858, in Paris – 28 October 1912 in Paris), was a sculptor and engraver of French medals.

Biography
He was educated at the École des beaux-arts where his teachers were Jules Cavelier, Jules-Clément Chaplain, and Émile Tasset.

In 1881, he won second great Prix de Rome and in 1887 the first grand prix of Rome, after which he spent three years at the villa Médicis.

In 1900, he designed the official medals for the 1900 Summer Olympics held in Paris. These medals are unique in being the only Olympic medals to  be rectangular rather than the traditional circular design.
Member of the Société des artistes français since 1896, he was elected member of the Académie des beaux-arts in 1909.

His son Jean de Vernon (1897–1975), was likewise an engraver, medallist and a French sculptor.

A prize for engraving bears his name and that of his son Jean: "Prix Frédéric et Jean de Vernon – Gravure".

Works

Bibliography 
 E. Bénézit, Dictionnaire des peintres, sculpteurs, dessinateurs et graveurs. 1976. Tome 10, page 469.

References

External links 

 
 Some of his works

1858 births
1912 deaths
19th-century engravers
20th-century engravers
French engravers
Artists from Paris
French medallists
Members of the Académie des beaux-arts
Prix de Rome for engraving
20th-century French sculptors
19th-century French sculptors
French male sculptors
20th-century French printmakers
19th-century French male artists